Persatuan Sepakbola Taman Setia Budi Indah (en: Association Football Setia Budi Indah Garden) or PS Tasbi is an  Indonesian football club based in Medan, North Sumatra. Club currently played in Liga 3 North Sumatra.

History
The club was founded in 1992 as a forum for the development of football in the city of Medan in particular and Indonesia in general. In 2012 the club formed a team with the name Tasbi Futsal Futsal Club who competed in the Amateur Futsal League since 2012. The club also formed a special management for the development of young players by the name of Pro Star Management Tasbi.

Achievements
Source

PSLB Cup champions : 2009
Pengcab PSSI Medan Gold Cup champions : 2010
Danpomal Lantamal Cup champions : 2011
Pomad Cup champions : 2011
Klumpang Putra Cup champions : 2012
Liga Indonesia Third Division : 
North Sumatra Province champions : 2012, 2013
Northern Sumatra Region runner-up : 2012
Northern Sumatra Region champions : 2013
Mencirim Putra Cup champions : 2013

Personnel
Source

Founder: Badiaraja Manurung, Jhon Ismadi Lubis, Bangga Gultom & M. Fadli Nasution
Chairman: Ricky Fahreza Syafii
Club advisory: H. Yopie Batubara, H. Chairulsyah Siregar, Hj. Riche Farida Pohan, Arifin Arsyad & Yogaswara

Board
Head office: Teguh Iman Gedidha
CEO: Zulkifli
Secretary: Fazril Matondang & Yoserizal
Deputy secretary: H. Heru Riyanto
Treasurer: Asrul Batubara & Herwan Hanafia
Deputy treasurer: Sutan P. Siregar & Sulaiman Rolas
Public relations: Dr. Fachari Candra, Rachamattullah, SH & Yose Rizal
Media: Septianda P.
Legal: Didit Aditya, SH
Equipment & transport: Yono, Ismail H. & Enda
Medical: Dr. Tri Adi Milano
Finance: Dr. Ikhfana Syafina
IT: Jefri Bulr Limbong & Arisi Muhammad
Arbitration: Tanjung & Ariadi

Staff
Manager: Asrul Batubara
Assistant Manager: H. Heru Riyanto
Head Coach: M. Rizal Dosin
Assistant Coach: Fandi Prima, Syarifuddin, Taufik Hidayat & Iwan
Goalkeeper Coach: Syahril NST & Agus Supardi
Technical advisory: M. Khaidir & Listiadi

References

External links
Official website

Football clubs in Indonesia
Association football clubs established in 1992
1992 establishments in Indonesia